Costești is a village in Ialoveni District, in central Moldova, with a population of 11,128 at the 2004 census. It is the second largest rural locality in the country by population, three times larger than the homonymous city in the north of Moldova.

Notable people
 Teodor Bârcă
 Constantin Bivol
 Victor Stepaniuc

References

Villages of Ialoveni District
Kishinyovsky Uyezd